The National Electoral Council (CNE) is one of the five branches of government of the Bolivarian Republic of Venezuela that was designed to be independent. It is the institution that has the responsibility of overseeing and guaranteeing the transparency of all elections and referendums in Venezuela at the local, regional, and national levels. The creation of the CNE was ratified in Venezuela's 1999 constitutional referendum. Following the election of Nicolás Maduro – Hugo Chávez's handpicked successor – into the presidency, the CNE has been described as being pro-Maduro.

History
The CNE was preceded by the Supreme Electoral Council, which was established under an electoral law on September 11, 1936. This entity was replaced by the CNE in 1997 with the passage of a new Organic Law of Suffrage and Participation.

Organization 
The National Electoral Council (CNE) is composed of five persons; three of them nominated by civil society, one by the faculties of law and political science at national universities, and one by the Citizen Power. The three members nominated by civil society shall have six alternates in ordinal sequence, and each appointed by the universities and the Citizen Power has two alternates, respectively. Members of the National Electoral Council last seven years in office and be elected separately: the three nominated by civil society at the beginning of each period of the National Assembly, and the other two in the middle of it. Members of the National Electoral Council shall be appointed by the National Assembly with the vote of two thirds of its members. Members of the National Electoral Council will designate from among its members its president, in accordance with the law. (Article 296 Constitution of the Bolivarian Republic of Venezuela).

The CNE officials are: Tibisay Lucena (CNE President, President of the National Electoral Commission), Sandra Oblitas Ruzza (Vice President, President of the Civil and Electoral Registry Commission), Vicente José Gregorio Díaz Silva (President of the Political Participation and Finance Commission), Socorro Elizabeth Hernández de Hernández (Member of the National Electoral Commission) and Tania D' Amelio Cardiet (Member of the Civil and Electoral Registry Commission). The CNE also has a general secretary, Xavier Antonio Moreno Reyes, and a juridical consultant, Roberto Ignacio Mirabal Acosta.

Analysis
The electoral system of Venezuela is  controversial. The Supreme Tribunal of Justice, with the majority supporting Chávez, elected officials to the supposedly non-partisan National Electoral Council of Venezuela (CNE) despite the 1999 Constitution stating for the National Assembly of Venezuela to perform the task. That resulted with the CNE board having a majority consisting of Chavistas or those that supported Chávez. Since then, the Venezuelan government controlled by the PSUV ruling party has manipulated elections, holding control of the CNE, the media and through government spending.

According to the United States Department of State, there is "widespread pre- and post-election fraud, including electoral irregularities, government interference, and manipulation of voters" and "opposition political parties [have] operated in a restrictive atmosphere characterized by intimidation, the threat of prosecution or administrative sanction on questionable charges, and restricted media access". International observers have had difficulties monitoring the elections, though the Bolivarian government accepts the praise of their elections from UNASUR allies.

See also
Venezuelan recall referendum of 2004
2005 Venezuelan parliamentary election
2006 Venezuelan presidential election
2007 Venezuelan constitutional referendum

References

External links
 

 
Venezuela